Lake Chaupicocha (possibly from Quechua chawpi central, middle, qucha lake) is a lake in Peru located in the Lima Region, Oyón Province, Oyón District. It lies north of the mountain Garguac.

References 

Lakes of Peru
Lakes of Lima Region